Admission control is a validation process in communication systems where a check is performed before a connection is established to see if current resources are sufficient for the proposed connection.

Applications
For some applications, dedicated resources (such as a wavelength across an optical network) may be needed in which case admission control has to verify availability of such resources before a request can be admitted.

For more elastic applications, a total volume of resources may be needed prior to some deadline in order to satisfy a new request, in which case admission control needs to verify availability of resources at the time and perform scheduling to guarantee satisfaction of an admitted request.

Admission control systems
Asynchronous Transfer Mode
Audio Video Bridging using Stream Reservation Protocol
IEEE 1394
Integrated services on IP networks
Public switched telephone network

References

External links
Papers about Admission Control in DiffServ systems on Google Scholar
Deadline-aware Admission Control for Large Inter-Datacenter Transfers

Internet Standards
Networking standards